Hadden-Margolis House is a historic home located at Harrison, Westchester County, New York. It was originally built about 1750 with later modifications in the 19th century in the Italianate style and early 20th century Colonial Revival style.  It is a -story, center hall type dwelling covered in stucco over a heavy wood-frame structure.  It has a stone foundation and straight pitched gable roof.

It was added to the National Register of Historic Places in 2008.

See also
National Register of Historic Places listings in southern Westchester County, New York

References

Harrison, New York
Houses in Westchester County, New York
Houses completed in 1750
Houses on the National Register of Historic Places in New York (state)
National Register of Historic Places in Westchester County, New York